HD 186302 (also designated HIP 97507) is a star in the constellation of Pavo. It was identified in November 2018 as a potential solar sibling to the Sun. Similar by spectrum and size, it was suspected to have formed in the same stellar nursery as the Sun 4.6 billion years ago. Common origin with Sun was found to be unlikely in a 2019 paper, as HD 186302's galactic orbit is very different from Sun's.

See also
 HD 162826; the first star identified as a solar sibling in February 2014, in Hercules.

References

Solar twins
G-type main-sequence stars
186302
097507
J19490644-7011167
Pavo (constellation)